The Tanana River  (Lower Tanana: Tth'eetoo', Upper Tanana: Tth’iitu’ Niign) is a  tributary of the Yukon River in the U.S. state of Alaska. According to linguist and anthropologist William Bright, the name is from the Koyukon (Athabaskan) tene no, tenene, literally "trail river".

The river's headwaters are located at the confluence of the Chisana and Nabesna rivers just north of Northway in eastern Alaska. The Tanana flows in a northwest direction from near the border with the Yukon Territory, and laterally along the northern slope of the Alaska Range, roughly paralleled by the Alaska Highway. In central Alaska, it emerges into a lowland marsh region known as the Tanana Valley and passes south of the city of Fairbanks.

In the marsh regions it is joined by several large tributaries, including the Nenana (near the city of Nenana) and the Kantishna. It passes the village of Manley Hot Springs and empties into the Yukon near the town of Tanana.

The Nenana Ice Classic, begun in 1917, is an annual guessing game about the date of the ice break-up. In October or November, after the freeze has begun, a tripod is planted in ice in the middle of the river. The tripod is connected to an on-shore clock that stops when the tripod begins to move during the spring thaw. Over the years, the break-up date has varied from April 20 to May 20. Betting on the exact time of the break-up takes the form of a lottery, called the Nenana Ice Classic.

History
Human habitation of the Yukon basin, including the Tanana watershed, began more than 12,000 years ago. Several sites in the watershed have produced evidence of occupation by Paleo-Arctic people. Later residents include people of the Tanana tribe, which has had a presence in the region for 1,200 years.
  
In the summer of 1885, Lieutenant Henry Tureman Allen of the U.S. Army undertook the first recorded exploration of the Tanana River. In 1883, Lieutenant Frederick Schwatka and his party had entered the Yukon watershed by way of Canada and floated to the mouth of the Yukon. Allen's goal was to find an all-Alaska route to the Yukon River. He and his men ascended the Copper River, crossed into Tanana River drainage, and descended the Tanana to the Yukon and down it to the mouth. During the five-month trip, the Allen party mapped the courses of the Copper, Tanana, and Koyukuk rivers.

In the early 21st century, the basin is largely wilderness unchanged by human activity. Fairbanks, a metropolitan area with about 100,000 residents in 2019, is a center of placer gold mining, which has continued in the basin since the mid-19th century. Limited farming also occurs in the valley near Fairbanks.

During World War II, it was proposed to resettle Finnish refugees in areas around the Tanana River (Operation Alaska).

Nenana Ice Classic
Since the early 1900s, Alaskans have been gambling on when the river would melt. Each year, thousands pay $2.50 to guess the exact date and minute the Tanana River ice will go out in Nenana. The Nenana Ice Classic is a fundraiser for local charities and has awarded some large prizes. In 2010, after the ice went out on April 29, three lottery winners split a jackpot of $279,030. In 2012, the record prize was $350,000.

Major tributaries (in descending order of elevation)

Chisana River
Nabesna River
Kalutna River
Tok River
Robertson River
Johnson River
Little Gerstle River
Healy River
Volkmar River
Gerstle River
Clearwater Creek
Goodpaster River
Delta River
Delta Creek
Little Delta River
Salcha River
Little Salcha River
Chena River
North Fork
South Fork
Wood River
Tatlanika River
Nenana River
Teklanika River
Seventeen Mile Slough
Tolovana River
Kantishna River
Zitziana River
Cosna River
Chitanana River

See also
 List of rivers of Alaska
 List of longest rivers of the United States (by main stem)

Notes and references
Notes

References

Works cited
Benke, Arthur C., ed., and Cushing, Colbert E., ed. (2005). Rivers of North America. Burlington, Massachusetts: Elsevier Academic Press. .

Tanana Athabaskans
Rivers of Fairbanks North Star Borough, Alaska
Rivers of Alaska
Rivers of Southeast Fairbanks Census Area, Alaska
Rivers of Yukon–Koyukuk Census Area, Alaska
Tributaries of the Yukon River
Rivers of Unorganized Borough, Alaska